Emma Russell (born 27 December 2003) is a Scottish swimmer. She competed in the women's 50 metre freestyle event at the 2020 European Aquatics Championships, in Budapest, Hungary.

References

External links
 

2003 births
Living people
Scottish female swimmers
Scottish female freestyle swimmers
Place of birth missing (living people)
European Aquatics Championships medalists in swimming
Swimmers at the 2022 Commonwealth Games
Commonwealth Games competitors for Scotland
21st-century Scottish women
Sportspeople from Edinburgh